NewRiver REIT plc is a specialist listed real estate investment trust (REIT), focused primarily on retail and leisure property. The company owns 33 shopping centres, 25 retail warehouses, 14 high street units and over 700 public houses. The company is listed on the London Stock Exchange.

History
The company was established by Allan Lockhart and David Lockhart as a property company focusing on the retail sector under the name NewRiver Retail in September 2008. The company was the subject of an initial public offering on the London Stock Exchange in September 2009. 

In 2009 Mark Davies, the then-husband (divorced in 2017) of the Conservative MP Mims Davies joined the company as finance director. The company have since donated to her "local party organisation or indirectly via a central party organisation" 

The company acquired 202 pubs from Marston's for £90 million in December 2013 and 158 pubs from Punch Taverns for £53.5 million in August 2015. The company altered its structure and changed its name to NewRiver REIT in July 2016.

In February 2018, David Lockhart stepped down as CEO and was replaced by Allan Lockhart. David Lockhart became Executive Deputy Chairman.

Operations
The company owns numerous shopping centres (geographically north to south):
 

 Broadway Shopping Centre, Bexleyheath,
 Newkirkgate Shopping Centre, Leith,
 Piazza Shopping Centre, Paisley,
 The Avenue, Newton Mearns,
 Burns Mall, Kilmarnock,
 The Beacon Shopping Centre, North Shields,
 Forum Shopping Centre, Wallsend,
 Abbeycentre, Newtownabbey,
 Hillstreet Shopping Centre, Middlesbrough
 Cornmill shopping centre, Darlington
 Promenades Shopping Centre, Bridlington,
 Arndale Shopping Centre, Morecambe,
 The Prospect Shopping Centre, Hull,
 The Ridings Centre, Wakefield,
 Packhorse Shopping Centre, Huddersfield,
 Albert Square, Widnes,
 Hildreds Shopping Centre, Skegness,
 The Deeping Centre, Market Deeping,
 Horsefair Shopping Centre, Wisbech,
 Central Square Shopping Centre, Erdington,
 Merlins Walk, Carmarthen,
 St Elli, Llanelli,
 Gloucester Green, Oxford,
 Templars Square, Cowley,
 Newlands Shopping Centre, Witham,
 Three Horseshoe Walk, Warminster,
 The Martlets Shopping Centre, Burgess Hill,
 Locksheath Shopping Village, Fareham,
 Priory Meadow Shopping Centre, Hastings,
 The Montague Centre, Worthing,
 Sovereign Shopping Centre, Boscombe.

References

External links
Official site

Companies based in the City of Westminster
British companies established in 2008
Real estate investment trusts of the United Kingdom